Aree Wiratthaworn (born February 26, 1980) is a Thai weightlifter.

She competed in the women's 48 kg at the 2004 Summer Olympics and won the bronze medal with 200.0 kg in total.

At the 2005 World Weightlifting Championships she won the bronze medal in the 48 kg category.

At the 2006 World Weightlifting Championships she won the silver medal in the 48 kg category.
She snatched 85 kg and clean and jerked an additional 103 kg for a total of 188 kg, 29 kg behind winner Yang.

References

Aree Wiratthaworn
Weightlifters at the 2004 Summer Olympics
Aree Wiratthaworn
Aree Wiratthaworn
1980 births
Living people
Olympic medalists in weightlifting
Weightlifters at the 2002 Asian Games
Medalists at the 2004 Summer Olympics
Aree Wiratthaworn
Southeast Asian Games medalists in weightlifting
Aree Wiratthaworn
Aree Wiratthaworn
Competitors at the 2003 Southeast Asian Games
Aree Wiratthaworn
World Weightlifting Championships medalists
Aree Wiratthaworn